The New Zealand National League is the name given to the current New Zealand top football competition. Originally set up as the New Zealand National Soccer League there has been many versions of the competition as well as many different names. The most common format saw club teams play each other, at least two times, on a home and away basis. At the completion of those games, the best-performing team was declared as the New Zealand champion. The latest version has the clubs play in their regional leagues with the top teams qualifying for the Championship phase to then play each other for the champion.

Leagues structures
The national competition has had many different formats:

1970–1992
When the National Soccer League was launched in 1970, it became the first national league for any sport in New Zealand. It involved clubs playing each other two times, on a home and away basis. Two points were awarded for a win, and one point was awarded for a draw. The club with the greatest number of points was declared the champion. The league was open and clubs could be relegated from it and promoted to it.

The National Soccer League continued until 1992 when the League was disbanded due to financial reasons.

Season results

1993–1995

Following the dissolution of the league a new competition, called Superclub Championship, was launched to decide the top club in the country. The top 10 clubs in each three regional groups (Northern, Central, Southern) would play each other home and away with $10,000 going to the team that finished first in their region, $7,000 for second and $5,000 for third. Then the country's top eight teams, being three teams from northern, and central regions, and two from the south, combine to play each other once. After that the top four teams then play each other once before culminating in a grand final between the top two from that round. For the team that finished first, they were paid $30,000, $15,000 went to the runner-up with $5,000 to third and fourth.

The winners in those years were as follows:

The increase in the number of teams participating for the championship, as well as lack of a true national league system, caused a strong drop in playing standards. It was clear that New Zealand not only needed a national league, but also one which was financially stable.

1996–1998

In 1996 a National League was launched for the second time in the history of New Zealand soccer. This time however, the league was (mostly) played during the summer months and did not feature relegation and promotion. Teams were invited to participate and the selection criteria involved the financial strength of the club and its location. The league also featured a championship play-off session at the end of the seasons, involving teams finishing high in the table.

To further upset the traditionalists, penalties followed matches which ended in a draw. The winners of the penalty shoot-out were awarded two points, the losers one point while winners in the regular 90 minutes were awarded four points (although this system as dropped in the last year of the National Summer Soccer League). The winners in those years were:

1999

In 1999, the National Soccer League again took a break. The competition for determining the New Zealand champion was moved back to (mostly) winter months. Two leagues were created, the North Island Soccer League (NISL) and the South Island Soccer League (SISL). The winner of the NISL, Central United, defeated the winner of the SISL, Dunedin Technical, 3–1, in extra time, in the championship final.

2000–2003
The National Soccer League was launched for the third time in 2000 as the National Club Championship. Like the original in 1970, it was played during (mostly) winter months and a promotion and relegation system was used. In the first season, a bonus point was awarded for scoring four or more goals in one match but that system was dropped in subsequent seasons. The championship play-offs system at the end of the league was the major difference when compared with the competition launched in 1970.

Seven teams, participating in the first edition, came from the NISL (Central United, Waitakere City, Napier City Rovers, Mt Wellington, Miramar Rangers, Metro and Manawatu AFC) and three came from the SISL (Dunedin Technical, Nelson Suburbs, Woolston WMC).

2004
2004 was the transition year between the National Soccer League and the New Zealand Football championship. Regional competitions were played but no New Zealand champion was determined.

2004–2021

On 15 October 2004 the New Zealand Football Championship was launched (NZFC). It marked a turning point in the history of the game in New Zealand, as for the first time traditional clubs were not eligible to participate in the top league. They were replaced by eight franchise style entities.

2021–

In March 2021, New Zealand Football announced a change to the structure of both the premiership and the top regional leagues around the country. The four top regional leagues (NRFL Premier, Central Premier League, Mainland Premier League and the FootballSouth Premier League) would be formed into the Northern League, Central League, and the Southern League. These leagues would allow local clubs to qualify for the premiership season (now known as the National League Championship), with the top 4 teams from the Northern League, the top 3 teams from the Central League, and the top 2 teams from the Southern League making up the competition, alongside the Wellington Phoenix Reserve side. All teams that qualify plus the Phoenix Reserves, would then play a single round-robin competition between October and December. The top two placed teams will then progress to the Grand Final.

Champions

†Disbanded teams
#Club has since merged into a new team

See also
 Football in New Zealand
 National Women's League
 Chatham Cup
 Kate Sheppard Cup

References

External links
New Zealand Football National Competition Review
National League - The Ultimate New Zealand Soccer Website
The National League Debates
RSSSF.com - New Zealand - List of Champions - National Champions since 1970

New Zealand National Soccer League
Defunct association football leagues in New Zealand